Why Truth Matters is a book by Ophelia Benson and Jeremy Stangroom published by Continuum Books in 2006.

It was widely praised on its release, and reviewed in the Times Literary Supplement, The Guardian and the Financial Times.

Author Johann Hari called it "a sassy and profound response to this cascade of superstition and silliness."

References

External links
 Why Truth Matters Extracts from Butterflies and Wheels
Official website

2006 non-fiction books
English-language books
Works by Jeremy Stangroom
Works by Ophelia Benson
Truth